Vishal Singh (born 27 December 1993  Jamshedpur, present Jharkhand, formerly Bihar) is an Indian cricketer who plays for Jharkhand. He made his List A debut on 13 November 2014 in the 2014–15 Vijay Hazare Trophy
He studied at Bharat Sevashram Pranav Children Worlds, Sonari.
.

References

External links
 

1993 births
Living people
Indian cricketers
Jharkhand cricketers
People from Gaya district
Cricketers from Bihar